Lac des Pins, Aumond, Quebec is a  spring-fed freshwater lake  in the Outaouais region of western Quebec. It is found in the La Vallee-de-la-Gatineau region near the town of Aumond, Quebec.  The area was settled by timber merchants in the late 1800s. Planfor, a nursery and tree grower, is located one block south of the lake.

References

Lakes of Outaouais